The Royal Canal Greenway is a greenway, in Ireland, which will become part of the western section of EuroVelo EV2, and the Dublin-Galway Greenway. It spans from Maynooth County Kildare to Longford and Cloondara, County Longford passing through counties Meath and Westmeath.

Sections

The greenway uses the routes of former towpaths of the Royal Canal.

The route makes up most of the older Royal Canal Way which links Ashtown, Dublin to Longford and Cloondara along the Royal Canal.

The official "starting" point for the Greenway is at Maynooth harbour, 28 km from the Eastern end of the Greenway; but works are either in planning, under construction or completed along the entire length of the Royal Canal Way.

Development
The development of the greenway, by Waterways Ireland with the local authorities along the route, was supported by government departments for Local Government, Tourism and Public Expenditure.

See also 
 EuroVelo

References

External links

Dublin-Galway Greenway
Tourism in County Kildare
Tourism in County Meath
Tourism in County Westmeath
Tourism in County Longford
Long-distance trails in the Republic of Ireland